The 1937 La Flèche Wallonne was the second edition of La Flèche Wallonne cycle race and was held on 2 May 1937. The race started in Tournai and finished in Ans. The race was won by Adolph Braeckeveldt.

General classification

References

1937 in road cycling
1937
1937 in Belgian sport